EVault is a part of Carbonite, and a distinguished brand name for some of Carbonite's product offerings. EVault and its partner network develop and support on-premises, cloud-based, and hybrid backup and recovery services for midmarket customers in need of data backup, data recovery, disaster recovery, regulatory compliance, and cloud storage or online backup services. The company primarily services customers in heavily regulated industries—financial services, legal, health care—as well as in government, education, telecommunications, and charity/nonprofit. Headquartered in Boston, Massachusetts, United States, the company has sales, service, and data center operations in North America and EMEA (Europe, the Middle East and Africa).

History
EVault was founded in 1997 as a cloud services company, backed by Council Ventures, with General Partner Gary Peat as lead investor in Series A in 2001. By 2006 EVault had become, through revenues and acquisitions (including the Open File Manager product line from St. Bernard Software), one of the fastest-growing technology companies in North America. Seagate Technology, which had acquired ActionFront Data Recovery Labs in November, 2005 and launched Seagate Recovery Services, acquired EVault in 2007. In 2007 Seagate also acquired MetaLINCS, which provides E-Discovery software and managed service solutions.

In September 2008, Seagate rebranded these acquisitions, which had been operating as a division of Seagate under the name Seagate Services, as a new entity, formally named i365, a Seagate Company. Seagate Recovery Services was taken from the i365 basket in 2011. In December 2011, the EVault name was restored in light of its greater cachet in the marketplace. On 16 December 2015, Carbonite acquired Seagate's EVault cloud backup service, including the brand name and logo, for $14M USD.

In 2019, Carbonite was acquired by OpenText, "a global leader in Enterprise Information Management".

Backup and Recovery Products and Services
The EVault line includes disk-based software, appliances, and software-as-a-service or SaaS, all of which share a common technology platform. The company encourages customers to deploy EVault on-premises and offsite technologies in combination as hybrid, or "cloud-connected," solutions.

 EVault SaaS for cloud-based backup and recovery.
 EVault Cloud Disaster Recovery Service for managed recovery in the EVault cloud with 4-, 24, and 48-hour Service Level Agreements.
 EVault Plug-n-Protect for appliance-based, on-premises, all-in-one backup and recovery.
 EVault Software for disk-to-disk, on-premises backup and recovery.
 EVault Endpoint Protection for integrated backup, recovery, and data security for laptops and desktops.

References

External links
EVault website
Cloud Support

Computer storage companies
Seagate Technology